USS Walter Adams (SP-400), or ID-400, was a United States Navy patrol vessel in commission from 1918 to 1919.
 
SS Walter Adams was a wooden-hulled steam fishing trawler built in 1890 by Robert Palmer and Son, of Noank, Connecticut, and rebuilt in 1898. The U.S. Navy inspected her for possible naval service in March 1917 and again in June 1918, and chartered her on 23 June 1918 for World War I service in the 6th Naval District. She was commissioned on 1 October 1918 as USS Walter Adams. Photographs show that she had the designation "SP-400" painted on her bow and she was used as a patrol boat like other units with an "SP" designation during World War I, although her data card lists her as having Identification Number (Id. No.) 400, or "ID-400", the type of designation given to cargo ships, tankers, and transports taken up from civilian service for use during World War I.

Walter Adams operated locally out of Charleston, South Carolina, through the end of World War I. There are no records indicating exactly what she did during her operational career, but it appears likely that she conducted practice minesweeping operations.

Walter Adams was decommissioned at the Customs House Dock at Wilmington, North Carolina, on 10 January 1919, struck from the Navy List the same day, and simultaneously returned to her owner.

Notes

References

External links

Patrol vessels of the United States Navy
World War I patrol vessels of the United States
Ships built in Groton, Connecticut
1890 ships